Engystomops pustulatus (common name: Guayaquil dwarf frog) is a species of frog in the family Leptodactylidae. It is known with certainty from western Ecuador, whereas the status of Peruvian records is ambiguous as they may refer to an undescribed species or possibly Engystomops puyango. Nevertheless, given that E. pustulatus is now known from Huaquillas in southern Ecuador, near the Peruvian border, it is likely to be found in Peru too.

Description
Adult males measure  and adult females  in snout–vent length. The snout is rounded. The tympanum is visible and round. Maxillary and premaxillary teeth are present. The fingers have no webbing nor expanded discs. The dorsum is strongly tubercular, with enlarged and somewhat elongated tubercles forming a "ʌ" pattern in the scapular region. The belly is smooth. There is an elongated row of glands on the flank.

Habitat and ecology
It can also be found in human-modified habitats. It is an explosive breeder that lays the eggs in foam nests in temporary pools. Juveniles feed primarily on small food items such as termites and ants. Adults prey upon larger items, such as snails, coleopterans, and isopods.

Conservation
Engystomops pustulatus can be abundant during reproductive events. Though an adaptable species, it is potentially threatened by habitat loss. It is present in the Machalilla National Park.

References

pustulatus
Amphibians of Ecuador
Endemic fauna of Ecuador
Taxa named by Benjamin Shreve
Amphibians described in 1941
Taxonomy articles created by Polbot